Georges Peyroche (born 27 January 1937) is a French football player and manager.

References

External links
 
 
 Profile at racingstub.com
 Profile at psg70.free.fr

1937 births
Living people
French footballers
Association football forwards
France international footballers
AS Saint-Étienne players
RC Strasbourg Alsace players
Stade Français (association football) players
Lille OSC players
Nîmes Olympique players
Ligue 1 players
Ligue 2 players
French football managers
Lille OSC managers
Paris Saint-Germain F.C. managers
Valenciennes FC managers
Sportspeople from Loire (department)
Footballers from Auvergne-Rhône-Alpes